Marko Daňo (born 30 November 1994) is an Austrian-born Slovak professional ice hockey right winger for HC Oceláři Třinec of the Czech Extraliga (ELH). He was originally drafted by the Columbus Blue Jackets in the first round, 27th overall, at the 2013 NHL Entry Draft and made his NHL debut in 2014. Before playing in the NHL, Daňo played professionally for Slovan Bratislava of the Kontinental Hockey League (KHL) for two seasons.

Daňo's father, Jozef Daňo, was also an ice hockey player and played for the Slovak national team at the 1994 and 1998 Winter Olympics.

Playing career
Daňo played in the 2007 Quebec International Pee-Wee Hockey Tournament with a youth team from Bratislava. He was ranked twelfth among International Skaters by the NHL Central Scouting Services in their final rankings for the 2013 NHL Entry Draft. He was selected in the first round, 27th overall by the Columbus Blue Jackets. Daňo returned to Slovan Bratislava of the Kontinental Hockey League (KHL) for the 2013–14 season. On 14 March 2014, the Blue Jackets signed Daňo to a three-year, entry-level contract.

Daňo made his NHL debut on 9 October 2014, against the Buffalo Sabres and scored his first career NHL goal, assist and point two days later, on 11 October, his second game, against the New York Rangers. He played eight games with Columbus to begin the 2014–15 season before being assigned to the Springfield Falcons, the Blue Jackets' American Hockey League (AHL) affiliate. In February 2015, however, he was recalled back to Columbus, where he played for the rest of regular season. Daňo finished the NHL season with eight goals and 13 assists (21 points) in 35 games played, as well as the AHL season with 11 goals and eight assists (19 points) in 39 games.

On 30 June 2015, Daňo, along with Jeremy Morin, Artem Anisimov and Corey Tropp, were traded to the Chicago Blackhawks in exchange for Brandon Saad, Alex Broadhurst and Michael Paliotta. After attending the Blackhawks training camp in preparation for the 2015–16 season, Daňo as a key piece in the Saad trade was surprisingly reassigned to AHL affiliate, the Rockford IceHogs to begin the year and continue his development. On 2 November 2015, Daňo was recalled by the Blackhawks to the NHL. He made his Chicago debut that night in a 4–2 victory against the Los Angeles Kings. He featured in 13 games with the Blackhawks scoring a goal and an assist before he was returned to the IceHogs.

On 25 February 2016, Daňo and the Blackhawks' first-round pick in the 2016 NHL Entry Draft was traded to the Winnipeg Jets in exchange for Andrew Ladd, Jay Harrison and Matt Fraser. In 21 games for the Jets, he recorded four goals and eight points in 21 games. In the following season, Daňo had eleven points in 38 games. He also skated six games for the team's AHL affiliate, the Manitoba Moose. On 13 June 2017, the Jets re-signed Daňo to a one-year contract worth $850,000. On 24 July 2018, Daňo re-signed with the Jets, to a one-year contract, worth $800,000.

After beginning the 2018–19 season as a healthy scratch, on 14 October 2018, the Jets placed Daňo on waivers. He was claimed by division rivals, the Colorado Avalanche the following day. Daňo went scoreless in eight games for the club with seven penalty minutes before on 22 November, he was placed back on waivers. The following day, he re-joined the Jets when they claimed him and was immediately reassigned to the AHL to join the Manitoba Moose. In remaining in the AHL for the remainder of the season, Daňo contributed with 12 goals and 30 points in 51 games for the Moose.

On 25 June 2019, Daňo's tenure with the Jets ended after he was not tendered a qualifying offer, releasing him as a free agent. He signed a one-year, two-way contract with the Blue Jackets on 8 August. In his return to the Blue Jackets in the 2019–20 season, Daňo spent the majority of his contract in the AHL with the Cleveland Monsters, recording four goals and 19 points in 46 regular season games. He added three games to his NHL totals, appearing with the Blue Jackets for the first time since 2015.

After failing to receive a qualifying offer for the second consecutive season, Daňo remained in Europe, returning to his original hometown club, HK Dukla Trenčín of the Tipsport Liga, signing a contract with an NHL-out clause on 4 October 2020. On 6 November 2020, Daňo secured a one-year, two-way contract for a third stint within the Winnipeg Jets organization. Unable to add to his NHL experience with the Jets, Daňo was assigned to the AHL and played in 13 games throughout the 2020–21 season with the Manitoba Moose.

As a free agent in the off-season, Daňo returned to Europe by signing an initial two-month contract with the option of a one-year deal with Czech-based club HC Oceláři Třinec of the ELH on 6 September 2021.

International play

Daňo participated at the 2012 World Junior Ice Hockey Championships for Slovakia, as well as at the 2013 and 2015 IIHF World Championship as a member of the Slovak men's team.

Personal life
Dano was born in Eisenstadt, Austria, but grew up in Trenčín, Slovakia.

Career statistics

Regular season and playoffs

International

References

External links
 
 
 
 

1994 births
Living people
Chicago Blackhawks players
Cleveland Monsters players
Colorado Avalanche players
Columbus Blue Jackets draft picks
Columbus Blue Jackets players
HK Dukla Trenčín players
HC Slovan Bratislava draft picks
HC Slovan Bratislava players
Manitoba Moose players
National Hockey League first-round draft picks
HC Oceláři Třinec players
Sportspeople from Trenčín
Rockford IceHogs (AHL) players
Slovak ice hockey right wingers
Springfield Falcons players
Winnipeg Jets players
Ice hockey players at the 2022 Winter Olympics
Olympic ice hockey players of Slovakia
Medalists at the 2022 Winter Olympics
Olympic bronze medalists for Slovakia
Olympic medalists in ice hockey
Slovak expatriate ice hockey players in the United States
Slovak expatriate ice hockey players in the Czech Republic
Slovak expatriate ice hockey players in Canada
People from Eisenstadt
Sportspeople from Burgenland